Bruno Bordeleau (September 4, 1868 – March 23, 1929) was a politician in Quebec, Canada and a Member of the Legislative Assembly of Quebec (MLA).

Early life
Bordeleau was born on September 4, 1868 in Saint-Stanislas, Mauricie. He practiced medicine in Sainte-Thècle.

Town Politics
Bruno Bordeleau was elected mayor of the municipality of Sainte-Thècle from 1912 to 1916. He was chairman of the organizing committee of the festival on July 30, 1922 of the arrival of electricity in the village of Sainte-Thècle.

Member of the legislature
He ran as a Liberal candidate in the provincial district of Champlain in 1916 and won against Conservative incumbent Joseph-Arthur Labissonnière.  He was re-elected in 1919 and 1923.

His seat was declared vacant in 1925, after he accepted a position as a registrar.

Death
He died on March 23, 1929 in Quebec City.

References

 René Veillette, article "Construction des écoles" (Schools construction), Journal Le Dynamique, August 15, 1973. This article mentioned that the old convent of Sainte-Thècle was built on 1915 (on Saint-Jacques street, neighbor of the rectory) on three sections of land owned in part by Dr. Bruno Bordeleau, the "Fabrique de Sainte-Thècle and Mr. Charles Jobin.
Gaétan Veillette (Saint-Hubert, QC), historian, referring to the Minutes of the School Board (Commission Scolaire) of Sainte-Thècle Village). 
 Monograph "Une ville du nord, Sainte-Thècle - 100 ans d'histoire" (A Northern City, Sainte-Thècle - 100 years of history), section "Dr. Bruno Bordeleau" written by Charles Magnan. Book edited in 1974 by the "Commission du Centenaire de Sainte-Thècle" (Sainte-Thècle Centennial Board), 229 pages, p. 145 to 147 (summary of Dr Bruno Bordeleau's biography). 
 Gaétan Veillette, article "Maires, secrétaires-trésoriers et députés" (Mayors, Secretary-Treasurers and parliament's members), Journal Le Dynamique, August 14, 1974, p. 4. Mentioning that Dr Bruno Bordeleau has been appointed secretary-treasurer in 1904 of the municipality of the Parish of Sainte-Thècle. Notary E. Vignault succeeded him in 1905. 
 Gaétan Veillette, article "Députés provinciaux" (Provincial Members of Parliament), Journal Le Dynamique, August 21, 1974, p. 4. Mentioning that Dr. Bruno Bordeleau was member of the Provincial Parliament for Champlain riding (1916-1925) and was elected as mayor of the municipality of Sainte-Thècle village in 1912. 
 Gaétan Veillette, article "Dr. Bruno Bordeleau, médecin et député" (Dr. Bruno Bordeleau, doctor and Provincial Parliament member), Journal Le Dynamique, June 4, 1975, p. 4. The article is a brief biographical summary indicating that it was the second resident physician in the history of Sainte-Thècle, secretary-treasurer of the municipality of Sainte-Thècle parish in 1904, member of the Parliament of Champlain provincial riding from 1916 to 1925 and registrar of Champlain provincial riding as of 1925. This article includes a photo (around 1920) of Dr Bruno Bordeleau on his lot of St-Michel-Nord row. (Archives: Mrs Flore Guillemette. Photograph: Mr. Georges Payen). 
 Gaétan Veillette, article "La Caisse populaire" (Credit Union) (de Sainte-Thècle), Journal Le Dynamique, December 22, 1976, p. 36, mentioning that Dr. Bruno Bordeleau was the founder president of the board of "Caisse populaire" (Credit-Union) of Sainte-Thècle. 
 Gaétan Veillette, article "Les cabanes à sucre (moitié nord de Sainte-Thècle)" (Sugar Shack of Northern half of Sainte-Thècle), Journal Le Dynamique, May 26, 1976, p. 4, mentioning that Dr. Bruno Bordeleau operated around 1906 a sugar shack in rang (row) St-Michel-Nord. 

1868 births
1929 deaths
Mayors of places in Quebec
Quebec Liberal Party MNAs